Brotulotaenia is a genus of cusk-eels. It is the only genus in the subfamily Brotulotaeniinae.

Species 
There are currently four recognized species in this genus:
 Brotulotaenia brevicauda Cohen, 1974
 Brotulotaenia crassa A. E. Parr, 1934 (Violet cusk eel)
 Brotulotaenia nielseni Cohen, 1974
 Brotulotaenia nigra A. E. Parr, 1933 (Dark cusk)

References 

Ophidiidae